Sodium arsenide, also known as trisodium arsenide, is the inorganic compound of sodium and arsenic with the formula Na3As. It is a dark colored solid that degrades upon contact with water or air. It is prepared by the reaction of the elements at 200–400 °C. The compound is mainly of interest as exhibiting an archetypal structure. The normal pressure "sodium arsenide" phase is adopted by many alkali metal pnictides. At 3.6 gigapascals, Na3As adopts the Li3Bi structure, which is another archetypal structure.  Sodium arsenide is a crystalline solid used as a semiconductor and in photo optic applications. Its IUPAC name is disodioarsanylsodium.

References

 
Sodium compounds